Themelthorpe is a civil parish in the English county of Norfolk,  north west of Reepham.
For the purposes of local government, it falls within the district of Broadland.

Themelthorpe Curve
The Themelthorpe Curve was built to join two separate stretches of railway, the section from Themelthorpe to Norwich which built in 1882 by the Midland and Great Northern Joint Railway and the line from Themelthorpe to Aylsham, completed in 1883 by the Great Eastern Railway. This section was to be the final section of railway track built in Norfolk by British Rail and was the sharpest curve in the whole of the British rail network. It was opened in 1960 to shorten the route of freight trains carrying concrete products running from a terminal at Lenwade, and was closed by 1985.  It is now part of the Marriott's Way footpath.

Notes

External links

Broadland
Villages in Norfolk
Civil parishes in Norfolk